Bever may refer to:

Bever, Belgium, a municipality located in the Belgian province of Flemish Brabant
Strombeek-Bever, part of the Belgian municipality of Grimbergen
Bever, Switzerland, a municipality in the district of Maloja of the Canton of Graubünden, Switzerland
Bever railway station, a Rhaetian Railway station
Bever (Ems), a tributary to the river Ems, North Rhine-Westphalia, Germany
Bever (Oste), a tributary to the river Oste, Lower Saxony, Germany
Bever (Weser), a tributary to the river Weser, North Rhine-Westphalia, Germany
Bever (Wupper), a tributary to the river Wupper, North Rhine-Westphalia, Germany

People with the surname
Adolphe van Bever (1871–1927), French bibliographer
Georges Bever (1884–1973), French actor
James Bever, American biologist
Steve Bever, American baseball coach
Thomas Bever (born 1939), American psychologist potet